Saccostomus is a genus of rodent in the family Nesomyidae. 
It contains the following species:
 South African pouched mouse (Saccostomus campestris)
 Mearns's pouched mouse (Saccostomus mearnsi)

References

 
Taxa named by Wilhelm Peters
Rodent genera
Taxonomy articles created by Polbot